An 0-8-6-0, in the Whyte notation for the classification of steam locomotives by wheel arrangement, is an articulated locomotive with no leading wheels, eight driving wheels (4 axles) fixed in a rigid frame, six driving wheels (3 axles) and no trailing wheels. In the UIC system, this would be described as a DC't arrangement.

Examples

Six locomotives with this wheel arrangement were built by Kitson & Co. as Kitson Meyers for the Transandine Railway, three of which survive today.

References

0-8-6-0 locomotives
86,0-8-6-0
Kitson locomotives